Bradypterus is a genus of small insectivorous songbirds ("warblers") in the newly recognized grass warbler family (Locustellidae). They were formerly placed in the Sylviidae, which at that time was a wastebin taxon for the warbler-like Sylvioidea. The range of this genus extends through the warm regions from Africa around the Indian Ocean and far into Asia.

The locustellid bush warblers are related to the grass warblers of Locustella and Megalurus, but share lifestyle and related adaptations and apomorphies with bush warblers in the family Cettiidae. These belong to an older lineage of Sylvioidea. Both "bush warbler" genera are smallish birds well adapted to climbing among shrubbery. They are markedly long-tailed birds, at first glance somewhat reminiscent of wrens.

These are quite terrestrial birds, which live in densely vegetated habitats like thick forest and reedbeds. They will walk away from disturbance rather than flush. The plumage similarities and skulking lifestyle make these birds hard to see and identify.

Locustellid bush warblers tend towards greyish browns above and buffish or light grey tones below. They have little patterning apart from the ubiquitous supercilium. Altogether, they appear much like the plainer species among Acrocephalus marsh-warblers in coloration. Cettiid bush warblers tend to be somewhat more compact, with less pointed tails, but are otherwise very similar.

Species 
This genus has been recently revised. The Sri Lanka bush warbler is sometimes placed in this genus but is now placed in its own monotypic genus (Elaphrornis). Several other former members of this genus (e.g. the Chinese bush warbler) are now placed in Locustella. Victorin's warbler is no longer a member of this genus or even the family Locustellidae, but is now placed in its own monotypic genus Cryptillas in the African warbler family Macrosphenidae.

The genus contains 12 species:
 Knysna warbler, Bradypterus sylvaticus
 Bangwa forest warbler, Bradypterus bangwaensis
 Barratt's warbler, Bradypterus barratti
 Evergreen forest warbler, Bradypterus lopezi
 Cinnamon bracken warbler, Bradypterus cinnamomeus
 Grey emutail, Bradypterus seebohmi
 Brown emutail, Bradypterus brunneus
 Dja River scrub warbler, Bradypterus grandis
 Little rush warbler, Bradypterus baboecala
 White-winged swamp warbler, Bradypterus carpalis
 Grauer's swamp warbler, Bradypterus graueri
 Highland rush warbler, Bradypterus centralis

Footnotes

References 
 Beresford, P.; Barker, F.K.; Ryan, P.G.; & Crowe, T.M. (2005): African endemics span the tree of songbirds (Passeri): molecular systematics of several evolutionary 'enigmas'. Proc. Roy. Soc. Lond. B 272 (1565): 849–858.   Supplemental material
 del Hoyo, Josep; Elliott, Andrew & Sargatal, Jordi (eds.) (2006): Handbook of Birds of the World (Volume 11: Old World Flycatchers to Old World Warblers). Lynx Edicions, Barcelona. 

 
Locustellidae
Bird genera
Taxa named by William John Swainson